The Bombardier T2000, or Tram 2000, is a low-floor tram design developed for use on the Brussels tram system. The  Brussels tram system has a fleet of 51 cars and were delivered from 1993 to 1995. The cars are double ended cars with driver's cabin on both ends and separated from passengers. Made in Mannheim, Germany, they have a 100% low-floor design, which was later used on Flexity Outlook vehicles ordered by Brussels Intercommunal Transport Company as the successor to the T2000. The T2000 is attributed to generating more vibrations affecting surrounding structures than other trams in the STIB/MIVB fleet.

External links

T2000
Tram vehicles of Belgium

750 V DC multiple units